Leslie Jack Twentyman  is a prominent youth outreach worker and community activist in the western suburbs of Melbourne, Australia. Raised in Braybrook, he is one of Victoria's best known social campaigners, on issues ranging from homelessness, drug abuse, prison reform and social welfare.

Biography
His rise to prominence began in 1989. Radio 3XY sport journalist Doug Ackerly first suggested his social worker friend Les as someone who could provide comment for the station's news about a story on youth. Melbourne newspaper The Sunday Age heard Les on the station and later interviewed him for its own story followed by Melbourne's Channel 9. Despite the random nature of his initial media appearance, from there Les went on to be considered a youth issues 'expert' and the first point of call for Melbourne journalists for comment on a range of community issues.

Les became well known for his work at Open Family which helps street-children and runs a youth refuge house in Victoria that houses 200 young people a year. In 2009, Les left Open Family to work on his own 20thMan Fund which provides youth services in the western suburbs of Melbourne.

He was awarded the Medal of the Order of Australia in 1994, was a finalist for Australian of the Year in 2004, and was awarded Victorian of the Year in 2006.

He has been an independent candidate for the Victorian Legislative Council in 1992 and 1996. He also stood in the 2008 Kororoit by-election for the Victorian Legislative Assembly seat of Kororoit on 28 June 2008, coming second to Labor after the distribution of preferences. His campaign had been supported by the Electrical Trades Union and was managed by former independent MP Phil Cleary.

He wrote an autobiography, The Les Twentyman Story, which was published by Hardie Grant in 2000.

References

External links
 Les Twentyman Foundation website

Living people
Activists from Melbourne
Yarraville Football Club coaches
Year of birth missing (living people)
Recipients of the Medal of the Order of Australia
People from Braybrook, Victoria